Premium-Cola is a soft drink brand founded on November 23, 2001, in Hamburg, Germany, by a collective of fans of the German brand Afri-Cola, at the time reduced in caffeine.

The collective (which named itself "Interessengruppe Premium") started by running a protest campaign for more than two years against recipe changes in Afri-Cola.
This well-known German brand, founded in 1931, had just been bought by Mineralbrunnen Überkingen-Teinach AG in 1999, which then secretly changed the recipe: the new Afri-cola contained a reduced amount of caffeine (the original Afri-cola contained 250 mg/L), and the rather strong taste was significantly softened, in order to meet the taste of a wider variety of customers.

The protests of the "Interessengruppe Premium" led to some public awareness, but remained unsuccessful as far as Afri-cola was concerned, so they started producing the original recipe cola on their own and named it Premium-Cola.

To avoid legal issues with the Mineralbrunnen AG, one ingredient was changed: malic acid which was replaced with phosphoric acid.

See also 
 Semco, a Brazilian company that is operated by similar structures

References 

FINDING MARBLES; Inspiring Organization: Premium Cola
PSFK; About Premium Cola
delicious days; Premium-Cola for Premium Shops/

External links
official Homepage
Interview with founder
Portrait in Der Freitag (German)

Cola brands
German drinks
2001 establishments in Germany